Monte Tonale is a mountain in Lombardy, Italy. It has an elevation of 2,694 and 2,696 metres above sea level.

During World War I the place was heavily fought for between Italians holding Western side (Lombardy) and the troops of Habsburg Empire holding the Eastern side (Trentino). A memorial for the fallen Italian soldiers was erected during the fascist period.

See also
 Tonale Pass
 Rhaetian Alps

Mountains of the Alps
Mountains of Lombardy